Luka Drča (born 26 August 1987) is a Serbian former professional basketball player.

National team career 
Drča was member of the Serbian university basketball team what won the gold medal at the 2011 Summer Universiade in Shenzhen.

External links
 Luka Drča at eurobasket.com
 Luka Drča at fiba.com
 Luka Drča at utahutes.com

1987 births
Living people
ABA League players
Basketball players from Belgrade
Basketball League of Serbia players
BC Astana players
Guards (basketball)
KK Crvena zvezda players
KK Mega Basket players
OKK Beograd players
Rethymno B.C. players
Serbian men's basketball players
Serbian expatriate basketball people in Greece
Serbian expatriate basketball people in Kazakhstan
Serbian expatriate basketball people in Romania
Serbian expatriate basketball people in the United States
Utah Utes men's basketball players
Universiade medalists in basketball
Universiade gold medalists for Serbia
Medalists at the 2011 Summer Universiade